Opus Nocturne is the third studio album by Swedish black metal band Marduk. It was recorded and mixed at Hellspawn Studios in September 1994 and released that December by Osmose Productions. In 2004 the album was remastered by the bands former member Devo Andersson and re-released in 2006 as digipak that included bonus rehearsal tracks. Opus Nocturne is the last Marduk album to feature Joakim Göthberg on vocals and Dan Swanö as mixer.

Opus Nocturne was the first album to showcase Marduk's signature hyper-speed blast beat tempo, however it still contained much of the melody from Those of the Unlight while retaining this break-neck speed, instead of sheer brutality on albums like Heaven Shall Burn... When We Are Gathered and Nightwing.

"Materialized in Stone" was originally the title for the track "From the Dark Past" that appears on Mayhem's De Mysteriis Dom Sathanas, the title was changed by Per Yngve Ohlin before his death. Marduk later adopted the title for the song on this album. They had previously also used a song title by Ohlin on their album Those of the Unlight. This is considered a vague tribute to Per and his works.

Track listing

Personnel
Marduk
 Joakim Göthberg – vocals
 Morgan Steinmeyer Håkansson – guitar
 B. War – bass
 Fredrik Andersson – drums

Guest
 Dan Swanö – mixing

References

1994 albums
Marduk (band) albums
Osmose Productions albums
Regain Records albums